Abdul Bari (1892–1947), also known as Acha Bacha, was a descendant of Syed Ibrahim Malik Baya, an Indian academic and social reformer. He sought to bring about social reform in Indian society by awakening people through education. He had a vision of India free from slavery, social inequality, and communal disharmony. He took part in the freedom movement, for which he was killed.

Biography

In 1937 was his first historical agreement with TISCO (now Tata Steel) Management.

Bari served as the president of the Bihar Pradesh Congress Committee from 1946 until his death on 28 March 1947. He was killed by three men who shot at him after an altercation by a Bari Path in Khusrupur, Bihar Province, during a stopover on his return from Dhanbad to Patna. In his tribute, Mahatma Gandhi stated that Bari "lived like a fakir in the service of his countrymen." Then Congress President J. B. Kripalani said, "His death has robbed India one of its bravest and most selfless soldiers of freedom. He was utterly free from communal bias and knew himself only as an Indian. His was a dedicated life filled with a passion for the service of the working classes."

On the first death anniversary of Bari, Rajendra Prasad recalled his contribution to the nation through a message dated 22 March 1948 published in Mazdur Avaz.

References

Sources
 Dr. Rajendra Prasad: Correspondence and Select documents Volume 8 by Valmiki Choudhary published by Centenary Publication
 At the feet of Mahatma Gandhi by Rajendra Prasad published by Asia Publication House
 History of the Freedom Movement in Bihar by Kalikinkar Datta published by Govt. of Bihar.
 Bihar through the Ages by Ritu Chaturvedi published by Sarup & Sons
 My Days With Gandhi by Nirmal Kumar Bose 
 Working together: Labour-management Co-operation in Training and in Technological and other Changes by Alan Gladstone, Muneto Ozaki published by International Labour Office, Geneva
 The Politics of the Labour Movement: An Essay on Differential Aspirations by Dilip Simeon
 History of The Indian Iron and Steel Co. Ltd by Dr. N.R.Srinivasan
 Official website of Tata Workers Union

External links
 Official website of Tata Workers Union
 The Politics of the Labour Movement: An Essay on Differential Aspirations
 Prof. Abdul Bari Technical Centre
 Tata workers union pays homage to Prof. Abdul Bari
 About Shahabad

1892 births
1947 deaths
People from Jamshedpur
20th-century Indian Muslims
Indian murder victims
Indian socialists
Indian National Congress politicians from Bihar
Indian independence activists from Bihar
Gandhians
Members of the Imperial Legislative Council of India
People murdered in Bihar